Sey may refer to:

Placenames
Puesto Sey, Argentinian village
Sey Gar Azim Khan, Iranian village
Sey Vik, Iranian village

People
Sey (surname)

See also
SEY, ICAO code for Air Seychelles
Seys, a surname